Jeff Cook is an American soccer coach. He is currently the head men's soccer coach at Pennsylvania State University.

Coaching career
Cook started his coaching career as an assistant at the University of Massachusetts Amherst. In 1991, he earned his first head coaching gig, becoming the head coach at Division III school, Wheaton College. While at Wheaton, he compiled a 31–22–4 record for three seasons.

In May 1994, he took an assistant coaching job at Dartmouth College, under head coach Fran O'Leary. He held that position until February 1996, when he became head coach at the University of Cincinnati. From 1996 to 2000, he led the Bearcats to a 44–42–8 record. He earned Conference USA Coach of the Year honors in 1997, after leading the Bearcats to a 7–8–3 record. In 1998, he led the Bearcats to the school's first ever NCAA Tournament appearance, going 12–5–3. In 1999, he led the Bearcats to its highest ever national ranking at 15th.

In 2001, he was named head men's soccer coach at Dartmouth College, compiling a 106–74–31 record with the Big Green. He led Dartmouth to five Ivy League championships, and to the NCAA tournament seven times, including two Sweet Sixteen berths. He resigned in April 2013, to take a position in the youth academy system of the Philadelphia Union.

In April 2013 he was named the head coach for the Philadelphia Union's U-16 Academy team. The Union are joining the U.S. Soccer Development Academy starting in the 2013–14 season.

On January 2, 2018, Cook was named the 12th coach of the Penn State Nittany Lions' men's soccer program. He led the team to a 6–9–2 record, but posted a six-win improvement in 2019, his second season at the helm, going 12–4–3 and leading Penn State to its first NCAA Tournament berth since 2014.

Cook was named the Big Ten Conference Soccer Coach of the Year after his successful 2021 season with Penn State seeing the team win the regular season championship for the first time in his tenure.

References

External links
 Penn State bio

Year of birth missing (living people)
Place of birth missing (living people)
Living people
American soccer coaches
Association football midfielders
Bates Bobcats men's soccer players
Philadelphia Union II coaches
Boston College Eagles men's soccer players
Cincinnati Bearcats men's soccer coaches
Dartmouth Big Green men's soccer coaches
Penn State Nittany Lions men's soccer coaches
Philadelphia Union non-playing staff
UMass Minutemen soccer coaches
Wheaton Thunder men's soccer coaches
Sportspeople from Springfield, Massachusetts
Soccer players from Massachusetts
USL Championship coaches
Association football players not categorized by nationality